Beach Street in a street located in Fremantle, Western Australia.  It runs along the historic (original before Victoria Quay was built) southern shore of the Swan River, south-east of the inner harbour, between Parry Street and East Street.

It crosses under the Fremantle Traffic Bridge and turns uphill next to the Fremantle Railway Bridge.

At one end, south-west of Parry Street, Beach Street becomes Elder Place; the other end, east of East Street, becomes Riverside Road.

In the 1920s its general condition was noted as being hazardous by local businesses.

The harbour section of the street is lined with heritage buildings, such Dalgety Woolstores, Australia Hotel, and other shipping and export related industries, as well as former businesses existing in the street, such as Western Ice Works, and Western Engineering and Foundry Company.
Due to its location, it was possible to see the development of the portion of Eastern Fremantle (formerly known as Richmond), from Beach Street over time.

Notes

 
Streets in Fremantle